James Francis Pawsey (born 21 August 1933) is a retired British Conservative politician. He was educated at Coventry Technical School and Coventry Technical College (both later merged into City College Coventry).

Pawsey was a local councillor in Warwickshire from 1965 to 1979, Member of Parliament for Rugby from 1979 to 1983 and then for Rugby and Kenilworth from 1983 to 1997, when he lost the seat in the general election to Labour's Andy King.

His son, Mark Pawsey, was elected Member of Parliament for the new constituency of Rugby at the 2010 general election.

References

External links
 

1933 births
Living people
Conservative Party (UK) MPs for English constituencies
UK MPs 1979–1983
UK MPs 1983–1987
UK MPs 1987–1992
UK MPs 1992–1997
People from the Borough of Rugby